Babu Baral (ببو برال real name Ayub Akhtar ایوب اختر) was a Pakistani stage actor and comedian (1964 – 2011). Baral started his career as a comedian from Gujranwala in 1982.

Stage dramas 
 Shartiya Mithay

References

1964 births
2011 deaths
Punjabi people
Pakistani male comedians
Pakistani male stage actors
Pakistani male television actors
People from Gujranwala